The Qarabağ 2019–20 season was Qarabağ's 27th Azerbaijan Premier League season, of which they were defending champions, and was their twelfth season under manager Gurban Gurbanov. Qarabağ were crowned Champions for the 7th season in a row when the season was curtailed on 19 June, whilst they had reached the semi-finals of the Azerbaijan Cup when it was ended. In Europe, Qarabağ were knocked out of the Champions League by APOEL in the Third qualifying round, dropping into the Europa League where they finished 3rd in a group with Sevilla, APOEL and Dudelange.

Season overview
On 7 June, Míchel signed a new two-year contract with Qarabağ.

On 24 June, Qarabağ announced the signing of Jaime Romero on a three-year contract after his Córdoba contract had been mutually ended the previous week.

On 4 July, Qarabağ announced the loan-signing of Ailton from VfB Stuttgart.

On 15 July, Qarabağ announced the signing of Faycal Rherras from AS Béziers on a two-year contract.

On 16 July, Qarabağ announced that Wilde-Donald Guerrier had left the club after failing to return to Azerbaijan after the summer break, and that Magaye Gueye had joined the club from Osmanlıspor.

On 30 August, Qarabağ announced that Dzon Delarge had left the club by mutual consent.

On 2 September, Qarabağ announced the loan signing of Asmir Begović from Bournemouth.

On 23 January, Qarabağ announced the  signing of Owusu Kwabena on a 3.5-year contract from Leganés.

On 3 January, Dani Quintana left the club to sign for China League One club Chengdu Better City.

On 13 March 2020, the Azerbaijan Premier League was postponed due to the COVID-19 pandemic.

On 8 June 2020, Qarabağ announced that Magaye Gueye had left the club by mutual consent.

On 19 June 2020, the AFFA announced that the 2019–20 season had been officially ended without the resumption of the remains matches due to the escalating situation of the COVID-19 pandemic in Azerbaijan.

Squad

Out on loan

Transfers

In

Out

Loans in

Loans out

Released

Friendlies

Competitions

Azerbaijan Premier League

Results summary

Results by round

Results

League table

Azerbaijan Cup

UEFA Champions League

Qualifying rounds

UEFA Europa League

Qualifying rounds

Group stage

Squad statistics

Appearances and goals

|-
|colspan="14"|Players away on loan:
|-
|colspan="14"|Players who left Qarabağ during the season:

|}

Goal scorers

Clean sheets

Disciplinary record

References

External links 
 Official Website

Qarabağ FK seasons
Qarabağ
Azerbaijani football clubs 2019–20 season